Bagdat Sanatuly Kairov (Bağdat Sanatūly Qaiyrov; born 27 April 1993) is a Kazakhstani professional footballer who plays for Tobol.

International career
He made his debut for Kazakhstan national football team on 13 November 2021 in a World Cup qualifier against France.

References

External links
 
 

1993 births
People from Aktobe
Living people
Kazakhstani footballers
Kazakhstan international footballers
Association football defenders
FC Aktobe players
FC Caspiy players
FC Kaisar players
FC Ordabasy players
FC Tobol players
Kazakhstan First Division players
Kazakhstan Premier League players